Communauté d'agglomération Saint-Avold Synergie is the communauté d'agglomération, an intercommunal structure, centred on the town of Saint-Avold. It is located in the Moselle department, in the Grand Est region, northeastern France. Created in 2017, its seat is in Saint-Avold. Its area is 347.5 km2. Its population was 52,757 in 2019, of which 15,415 in Saint-Avold proper.

Composition
The communauté d'agglomération consists of the following 41 communes:

Altrippe
Altviller
Baronville
Bérig-Vintrange
Biding
Bistroff
Boustroff
Brulange
Carling
Destry
Diesen
Diffembach-lès-Hellimer
Eincheville
Erstroff
Folschviller
Frémestroff
Freybouse
Gréning
Grostenquin
Guessling-Hémering
Harprich
Hellimer
L'Hôpital
Lachambre
Landroff
Laning
Lelling
Leyviller
Lixing-lès-Saint-Avold
Macheren
Maxstadt
Morhange
Petit-Tenquin
Porcelette
Racrange
Saint-Avold
Suisse
Vahl-Ebersing
Vallerange
Valmont
Viller

References

Saint-Avold Synergie
Saint-Avold Synergie